Cabot is a New England town located in the northeast corner of Washington County, Vermont, United States. The population was 1,443 at the 2020 census. It contains the unincorporated villages of Cabot Village, Cabot Plains, South Cabot, East Cabot, Molly's Pond (named after Molly, the wife of Indian Joe), and Lower Cabot. Cabot contains several ponds and dairy farms. It is the location of the Cabot Creamery, a producer and national distributor of dairy products, especially known for their cheddar cheese.

History

The town was named by settler Lyman Hitchcock after his wife, Sophia Cabot (no relation to Venetian explorers John and Sebastian Cabot). Lyman Hitchcock became in 1788 the first town clerk of Cabot.

By actual count, three hundred men from Cabot were eligible to serve during the Civil War. One hundred forty-five (48%) volunteered. Most served in units mustering in St. Johnsbury: the 16th, 3rd and 4th Vermont Regiments. Forty-five were killed, for a fatality rate of 31%. Furthermore, it is likely that most of the rest suffered non-fatal casualties. Seventeen of these dead are honored by name on a war monument which stands in town; the others were not known to those who erected the monument.

Demographics

As of the census of 2010, there were 1,433 people, 570 households, and 404 families residing in the town. The population density was 37.2 people per square mile (14.4/km2).  There were 771 housing units at an average density of 20.0 per square mile (7.7/km2).  The racial makeup of the town was 97.2% White, 0.6% Black or African American, 0.2% Native American, 0.3% Asian, 0% from other races, and 1.7% from two or more races. Hispanic or Latino of any race were 0.6% of the population.

There were 570 households, out of which 32.5% had children under the age of 18 living with them, 58.2% were married couples living together, 8.9% had a female householder with no husband present, and 29.1% were non-families. 23.0% of all households were made up of individuals, and 8.6% had someone living alone who was 65 years of age or older. The average household size was 2.51 and the average family size was 2.94.

In the town, the population was spread out, with 24.7% under the age of 18, 6.2% from 18 to 24, 22.3% from 25 to 44, 32.6% from 45 to 64, and 14.2% who were 65 years of age or older.  The median age was 43 years. For every 100 females, there were 100.4 males.  For every 100 females age 18 and over, there were 94.4 males.

As of the 2000 census, the median income for a household in the town was $43,092, and the median income for a family was $49,205. Males had a median income of $31,544 versus $25,000 for females. The per capita income for the town was $18,585.  About 4.4% of families and 7.5% of the population were below the poverty line, including 7.2% of those under age 18 and 5.7% of those age 65 or over.

Notable people 

 Zerah Colburn, math prodigy
 Carlos Everett Conant, professor, linguist, translator, interpreter of Philippine languages
 Edward M. Doe, Arizona Territorial jurist
 Peter Gray, psychologist, professor, and textbook author
 Luis Guzmán, actor; lives in Cabot
 John H. Senter, United States Attorney for Vermont, mayor of Montpelier, Vermont
 Ellen Bryant Voigt, poet, teacher, and founder of The Warren Wilson MFA Program for Writers
 Will Voigt, 2016 Nigerian Olympic basketball team coach
 Charles Carroll Webster, Minnesota state senator and lawyer

See also

 Cabot Creamery

References

 
Towns in Vermont
Towns in Washington County, Vermont